El Loa Airport (Spanish: Aeropuerto El Loa) , is the major airport serving Calama, a city in the Antofagasta Region of Chile. It is one of the largest airports in Chile.

There are plans to construct a second runway with capacity to accommodate wide body jets and military aircraft.

The Calama non-directional beacon (Ident: LOA) is located on the field.

Facilities

Passenger Terminal 
A new passenger terminal was inaugurated in 2014. In addition, there was extensive landscaping around the terminal and a new 500 space car park was built. The terminal has a few stores: duty-free shop, Air Britt and Pacific Club VIP lounge.

Other facilities 

Tenants
 Avis
 Econorent

Airlines and Destinations

Statistics
The number of passengers has been: 
2004: 247,821 
2005: 273,275 
2006: 315,725 
2013: 1,441,566

See also 
 Transport in Chile
 List of airports in Chile

References

External links 
 OpenStreetMap - El Loa Airport
 Sky Vector - El Loa
 
 

Airports in Antofagasta Region